George Clifford Buchheit (March 22, 1898 – May 24, 1972) was an American college basketball coach.  He was the head of the Kentucky Wildcats men's basketball team of the University of Kentucky from 1920 to 1924, where he compiled a 44–27 record.  From 1924 to 1928, Buchheit was the head coach of the Duke Blue Devils men's basketball team of Duke University.

From 1932 to 1945, he was the head coach for the Bloomsburg University of Pennsylvania football team and compiled a 15–27–4 record.

Buchheit attended University of Illinois.

Head coaching record

Basketball

References

External links
 basketball stats at BigBlueHistory.com
 

1898 births
1972 deaths
American football ends
Bloomsburg Huskies football coaches
Bloomsburg Huskies men's basketball coaches
Duke Blue Devils men's basketball coaches
Illinois Fighting Illini football players
Kentucky Wildcats men's basketball coaches
University of Illinois Urbana-Champaign alumni
Illinois Fighting Illini men's basketball players
Guards (basketball)